Scuderia Cameron Glickenhaus, also commonly known as Glickenhaus or SCG, is an American automotive company based in Sleepy Hollow, New York. Founded in 2004 by James Glickenhaus, it is dedicated to developing and manufacturing of high-performance cars.

The most iconic model of the brand is the SCG 003 that has competed in various competitions such as the 24 Hours of Nürburgring. The company also entered the FIA World Endurance Championship as a manufacturer in the Le Mans Hypercar category in the 2021 season with the SCG 007.

History 
Scuderia Cameron Glickenhaus, was founded in 2004 in New York City by film producer and entrepreneur James Glickenhaus. The goal was to develop limited, low-volume, high-performance racing cars for the Nürburgring 24 Hours races. In the first years, a professional team took part in competitions using modified Ferrari constructions.

In 2010, the Ferrari P4/5, built in one piece on a special order, served as a reference point for the work on the first proprietary SCG construction, the initial specification and concept of which was presented in September 2012. Pre-production prototypes entered their final testing phase in December 2014, and finally made their debut in February 2015 as the SCG 003 racing vehicle and the SCG 003S road hypercar.

For the production of both vehicles, cooperation was established with the Italian design studio and sports car manufacturer MAT, which lent its production lines in Turin. In 2017, a plan to launch the production of another civilian car called 004S, was presented, which finally went into production in 2020. In the same year, a racing variant, SCG 004C was produced for competition.

At the end of 2020, SCG presented its first car with a completely different concept in the form of the massive, road-performance off-road vehicle SCG Boot. In 2021, another race car called the SCG 007 was presented in the Le Mans Hypercar racing category, during the premiere of which it was announced that a series variant called SCG 007S would also be built.

Vehicles 
Scuderia Cameron Glickenhaus currently offers five types of cars, the SCG 003, SCG 004, SCG Boot, SCG 007, and the SCG 008 kit car. The SCG 006 model is no longer listed on the company's website.

References

External links 

American companies established in 2004
Sports car manufacturers
Motor vehicle manufacturers based in New York (state)
Vehicle manufacturing companies established in 2004
American racecar constructors
International GT Open teams
FIA World Endurance Championship teams
24 Hours of Le Mans teams